Heddy Kun (born 1936) is an Israeli painter.

Biography
Heddy Kun was born in Zagreb. Her parents and younger brother, Eliezer, were murdered in the Holocaust. They were all sent to the gas chambers in Auschwitz concentration camp. Kun escaped from the Nazis and hid in Budapest with her grandmother and her older brother, Shalom. After studying in the Budapest Academy of Art, she immigrated to Israel in 1956. Her son is the Israeli-American painter Shay Kun.

Art career
Kun has had many exhibitions in Israel and in New York, and also in London, Budapest, Sydney, Amsterdam, Paris, Berlin, Toronto, Rome and Brussels.

References

1936 births
Living people
20th-century Israeli women artists
21st-century Israeli women artists
Artists from Zagreb
Croatian Jews
Yugoslav emigrants to Israel
Israeli people of Croatian-Jewish descent
Israeli painters
Israeli women painters